Samantha "Sam" Rapoport is a former American football player who currently works for the National Football League (NFL) as Senior Director of Diversity, Equity and Inclusion. She was formerly the NFL's Senior Director of Football Development. She was initially hired by the NFL to bring more women to the operational side of the league. She is also involved in several other initiatives to get more women into football, including being on the board of the first ever all-girls tackle football league, the Utah Girls Tackle Football League. Rapoport has been named to People Magazine's “25 Women Changing The World”, Fortune's 40-under-40 and Named one of Sports Illustrated’s Most Powerful, Most Influential and Most Outstanding Women in Sports.

Football career 
Rapoport began playing flag football at the age of 12. She played quarterback for the Canadian Women's Flag Football Team, and the Montreal Blitz (a women's tackle team). In 2003, she applied for a marketing internship with the NFL. Included in her application was a football on which she had written "What other quarterback could accurately deliver a football 386 miles?".  She got the job and worked for the league for many years. She was awarded the NFL Commissioner's Innovation Award (2009) and the NFL Commissioner Award (2019) for her work. She left the NFL to work for USA Football, to try get more women around the world playing football. In 2016 she was hired back by the NFL to work as the Director of Football Development, replacing former Baltimore Ravens player Matt Birk. Since 2020, she has been the NFL's Senior Director of Diversity, Equity and Inclusion.

References 

Living people
Women National Football League executives
Year of birth missing (living people)
Female players of American football
American football quarterbacks